Ronald Leslie Dobson (26 March 1923 – 26 October 1994) was a New Zealand rugby union player. A second five-eighth, Dobson represented Auckland at a provincial level. He played one match for the New Zealand national side, the All Blacks, a test against the touring Australian team in 1949.

Dobson served as a gunner with the New Zealand Artillery, 2nd NZEF, during World War II, embarking for Britain in early 1944. Following the end of the war, he played for the New Zealand Army rugby team, known as the "Kiwis", appearing in 18 matches and scoring eight tries.

References

1923 births
1994 deaths
Rugby union players from Auckland
New Zealand military personnel of World War II
New Zealand rugby union players
New Zealand international rugby union players
Auckland rugby union players
Rugby union centres